Mong Hsat District or Mongsat District is a district of the Shan State in Myanmar. It consists of 2 townships 5 towns and 1095 villages.

Townships

The district contains the following townships:
Mong Hsat Township
Mong Tong Township

Mong Ping Township was moved under Kengtung District.

References

Mongsat District